Jackson may refer to:

People and fictional characters
 Jackson (name), including a list of people and fictional characters with the surname or given name

Places

Australia
 Jackson, Queensland, a town in the Maranoa Region
 Jackson North, Queensland, a locality in the Maranoa Region
 Jackson South, Queensland, a locality in the Maranoa Region
 Jackson oil field in Durham, Shire of Bulloo, Queensland
 Mount Jackson, Western Australia

Canada
 Jackson Inlet, Nunavut
 Jackson Island (Nunavut)
 Jackson, a small community southeast of London, Ontario

United States
 Jackson, Alabama
 Jackson, California
 Jackson, Georgia
 Jackson, Idaho
 Jackson, Indiana
 Jackson, Ripley County, Indiana
 Jackson, Kentucky
 Jackson, Louisiana
 Jackson, Maine
 Jackson, Michigan
 Jackson, Minnesota
 Jackson, Mississippi, the state capital and most populous city of Mississippi
 Jackson, Missouri
 Jackson, Montana
 Jackson, Nebraska
 Jackson, New Hampshire
 Jackson, Camden County, New Jersey
 Jackson Township, New Jersey
 Jackson, New York
 Jackson, North Carolina
 Jackson, Union County, North Carolina
 Jackson, Ohio
 Jackson Township, Susquehanna County, Pennsylvania
 Jackson, Pennsylvania
 Jackson, Rhode Island
 Jackson, South Carolina
 Jackson, Tennessee
 Jackson, Washington
 Jackson, Wisconsin (disambiguation)
 Jackson, Wyoming
 Jackson County (disambiguation)
 Jackson Hole, a valley in the state of Wyoming
 Jackson metropolitan area (disambiguation)
 Jackson Parish, Louisiana
 Jackson River (Virginia)
 Jackson Township (disambiguation)
 Lake Jackson (Georgia), a reservoir
 Mount Jackson (Colorado)
 Mount Jackson (Montana)
 Mount Jackson (Madison County, Montana), a mountain in Madison County, Montana
 Mount Jackson (New Hampshire)
 Mount Jackson (Wyoming)

Elsewhere
 Mount Jackson (Antarctica)
 Jackson River (New Zealand)
 Jackson Island, in Franz Josef Land, Russian Federation
 Jackson (crater), an impact crater on the far side of the Moon

Arts and entertainment
 Jackson (2008 film), an American film
 Jackson (2015 film), a film
 Jackson (album)
 "Jackson" (song), written by Jerry Leiber and Billy Edd Wheeler
 Classical Electrodynamics (book), a physics textbook often known by the name of its author: Jackson

Companies
 Jackson Guitars, a manufacturing company
 Jackson Laboratory, a biomedical research institution 
 Jackson National Life, a financial services company

Computing
 Jackson (API), a JSON processor for Java
 Jackson structured programming

Other uses
 United States twenty-dollar bill, nicknamed for Andrew Jackson, whose picture appears on the obverse side
 Jackson station (disambiguation)
 M36 tank destroyer, nicknamed the "Jackson", a United States tank destroyer in World War II

See also
 Jackson's (disambiguation), including Jacsksons
 Jackson Hole (disambiguation)
 Jacksonville (disambiguation)
 Jaxon (disambiguation)